Gino Bonichi (February 25, 1904 – November 9, 1933), known as Scipione, was an Italian painter and writer.

He was born in Macerata. In 1909 he  moved to Rome, where he later enrolled at the Scuola Libera di Nudo of the Accademia di Belle Arti di Roma. He founded with Mario Mafai and Antonietta Raphael the Scuola romana, a group of artists active in Rome who were influenced by Expressionism, and opposed the officially approved art of the Fascist period.  He exhibited his work for the first time in 1927. At about this time, he also began publishing his poetry and essays.

Scipione's interest in art history led him to study the Italian old masters, as well as El Greco and Goya. Expressionists such as Chaïm Soutine, James Ensor and George Grosz influenced the development of his style, which was characterized by mysticism and a personal symbolism. His period of greatest  activity was between 1927 and the autumn of 1930; during these years he produced his most important works, such as Still-life with a Bowler Hat (1929) and Still-life with a Feather (1929). He exhibited in the Venice Biennale in 1930, and at the first Rome Quadriennale in 1931. In the last two years of his life, the tuberculosis from which he had suffered for years forced him to abandon painting in favor of drawing. He died in Arco on November 9, 1933.

The  Italian painter Claudio Bonichi (born in 1943) is Scipione's nephew.

Works

Notes

References
Lucchesi, Sylvia. "Scipione [Bonichi, Gino]", Oxford Art Online
Pinto, Sandra. 2002. A history of Italian art in the 20th century. Milano: Skira Editore.
Scipione, and Giuseppe Marchiori. 1944. Disegni di Scipione. Bergamo: Istituto italiano d'arti grafiche.  
 Scipione(Gino Bonichi), Scuola Romana

External links
 * Scipione's Poems in English (Free eBook)

1904 births
1933 deaths
People from Macerata
20th-century Italian painters
Italian male painters
20th-century Italian male artists